Nelson-Kennedy Ledges State Park is a  public recreation area offering trails and picnicking located in Nelson Township, Portage County, Ohio, United States. It is accessible from U.S. Route 422 and State Route 305 via State Route 282.

History

Ecology

Activities

The park is open from dawn until dusk. To mark off the trails, a color-coding system is used on the rocks and trees. White is moderately easy, yellow and blue are medium difficulty, and red is extremely difficult, with some climbing of rocks involved.

Because of the cliffs and hazards along the trails, night hiking is not recommended due to the decreased visibility.

References

External links 
Nelson-Kennedy Ledges State Park Ohio Department of Natural Resources
Nelson-Kennedy Ledges State Park Map Ohio Department of Natural Resources

State parks of Ohio
Protected areas of Portage County, Ohio
Protected areas established in 1949
1949 establishments in Ohio